Draco was a shareware programming language created by Chris Gray. First developed for CP/M systems, Amiga version followed in 1987.

Although Draco, a blend of Pascal and C, was well suited for general purpose programming, its uniqueness as a language was its main weak point. Gray used Draco for the Amiga to create a port of Peter Langston's game Empire.

References

External links 
 CP/M distribution
 Draco Author Chris Grays compiler page covering Draco
 Freeware Draco-to-C converter at Aminet
 Source code of Draco at Aminet

Algol programming language family
Amiga development software
CP/M software